Inamkoppa is a village in Dharwad district of Karnataka, India.

Demographics 
As of the 2011 Census of India there were 207 households in Inamkoppa and a total population of 1,175 consisting of 609 males and 566 females. There were 171 children ages 0-6.

References

Villages in Dharwad district